Mier is an unincorporated community and census-designated place (CDP) in Richland Township, Grant County, Indiana, in the United States. As of the 2010 census it had a population of 78.

History
The community was named after Ciudad Mier, in Mexico. A post office was established at Mier in 1849, and remained in operation until it was discontinued in 1928.

Geography
Mier is located in northwestern Grant County, crossed by State Roads 13, 18, and 19. State Road 18 leads east  to Sweetser and west  to Converse, while State Road 13 leads north  to Somerset and south  to Swayzee. State Road 19 follows State Road 13 south from Mier and State Road 18 west from it.

Demographics

References

Census-designated places in Grant County, Indiana
Census-designated places in Indiana